Martin Carl Philipp Gropius (11 August 1824, Berlin – 13 December 1880) was a German architect.

Life

Gropius studied at the Bauakademie in Berlin and after graduation worked as a private architect. He received artistic direction from Karl Friedrich Schinkel and Karl Bötticher and continued his studies with prolonged trips through Greece and Italy.

In 1856 Gropius was appointed to a professorship at the Academy of Applied Art and was later a member of the Berlin-Brandenburg Academy of Sciences and Humanities as well as the Austrian Academy of Sciences. Until his death he worked with Heino Schmieden to develop Fa. Gropius & Schmieden, one of the largest architecture firms in Berlin.

Martin Gropius was the great-uncle of architect and Bauhaus founder Walter Gropius.

The present-day Martin Gropius Bau in Berlin was built in 1881 based on plans by Martin Gropius and Heino Schmieden as an applied art museum (the Kunstgewerbemuseum Berlin). It was constructed in the style of the Italian Renaissance and has a central atrium. Mosaics with allegories from various ages and the coats of arms of German states decorate the spaces between windows.
After World War I the Bau housed the Museum of Pre- and Early History as well as the oriental art collection. In the last weeks of the Second World War the building was bombed. Reconstruction of the building began in 1978 after it was placed under protection for historic preservation in 1966. Another restoration took place in 1999/2000. Today the Martin Gropius Bau is an important space for special exhibits of all kinds.

Martin Gropius is buried at Dreifaltigkeitsfriedhof 2 in the Kreuzberg neighborhood of Berlin.

Works
Along with representative buildings (e.g. the University in Kiel and the Gewandhaus in Leipzig), many clinics and hospitals were built in Berlin and Brandenburg based on Gropius's designs.

Martin Gropius Krankenhaus (Neuro-Psychiatric Hospital) in Neustadt-Eberswalde
Ungern-Sternberg palace in Tallinn, nowadays the main building of Estonian Academy of Sciences (1865–1868)
Friedrichshain Hospital in Berlin (1868–74), with Heino Schmieden
Hospital in Wiesbaden
University Building in Kiel (1873–76)
Military Hospital in Tempelhof, Berlin (1875–77)
Manor House in Neuruppin-Gentzrode (1876–1877)
Applied Art Museum (Martin Gropius Bau) in Kreuzberg, Berlin (1877–81), with Heino Schmieden
Second Gewandhaus in Leipzig (1882–84), completed by Heino Schmieden after Gropius's death.
Old Library at the University of Greifswald
Bureau of Mines in Saarbrücken (1877–1880)
Prussian Eastern Railway Headquarters in Bromberg, now Bydgoszcz, Poland

Many houses and villas in Berlin and its environs were built based on Gropius's designs. For example:

the Heesesche Villa at Lützow-Ufer
the Bleichrödersche Villa in Charlottenburg
the Mendelssohn House (with Heino Schmieden)
the Gruner-Haus
the Lessing-Haus
the Schloss Biesdorf
the Manor House Schloss Calberwisch bei Osterburg/Altmark (gemeinsam mit Heino Schmieden)

See also
 Prussian Eastern Railway Headquarters in Bydgoszcz

References

Literature

Own Writings
 Martin Gropius: Die Provinzial-Irren-Anstalt zu Neustadt-Eberswalde. Ernst & Korn, Berlin 1869.
 Karl Friedrich Schinkel: Dekorationen innerer Räume. Acht Blatt,  hrsg. von Martin Gropius. Ernst & Korn, Berlin 1874.
 Martin Gropius: Das Städtische Allgemeine Krankenhaus im Friedrichshain zu Berlin. Ernst & Korn, Berlin 1876.
 Martin Gropius, Heino Schmieden: Dekorationen innerer Räume. Ernst & Korn, Berlin 1877,1-3.	
 Martin Gropius (Hrsg.): Archiv für ornamentale Kunst. Red. durch Martin Gropius, hrsg. v. Deutsches Gewerbe-Museum Berlin. Mit erl. Text von L. Lohde. Winkelmann-Springer, Berlin 1870-71.

Further reading
 V. von Weltzien (Hrsg.): Das zweite Garnison-Lazareth für Berlin bei Tempelhof. Nach dem vom Königlichen Kriegs-Ministerium aufgestellten Bauprogramm entworfen und ausgeführt von Gropius & Schmieden. Ernst & Korn, Berlin 1879.
 Gropius in Eberswalde. Gropius-Bau der Landesklinik Eberswalde. be-bra, Berlin 2002. 
  Barbara Happe, Martin S. Fischer: Haus Auerbach von Walter Gropius mit Adolf Meyer. Wasmuth, Tübingen-Berlin 2003.

External links
  
 

1824 births
1880 deaths
Artists from Berlin
Members of the Austrian Academy of Sciences
Members of the Prussian Academy of Sciences
People from the Province of Brandenburg
Historicist architects
19th-century German architects
Walter Gropius